Bamboo is a 2023 Indian Marathi-language drama film directed by Vishal Devrukhkar and produced by Creative Vibe Productions. It stars Abhinay Berde, Vaishnavi Kalyankar Parth Bhalerao, Shivaji Satam and Samir Choughule. Bamboo was theatrically released on 26 January 2023.

Cast 

 Abhinay Berde as Chintamani Bhasme
Vaishnavi Kalyankar as Zuluk
 Parth Bhalerao as Madan
 Shivaji Satam as M.N. Bhasme
 Samir Choughule as Shashikant Prabhulkar
 Atul Kale as Babu Bhasme

Release 
The film was theatrically released on 26 January 2023 on the occasion of Republic day.

Soundtrack

References

External links 

 

2023 films
Indian drama films